The Mount Timpanogos Utah Temple is the 49th operating temple of the Church of Jesus Christ of Latter-day Saints. The temple is located in American Fork, Utah and is the second temple built in Utah County and the ninth in Utah.

Announcement
The temple was announced by Gordon B. Hinckley, then a counselor in the church's First Presidency, in general conference on October 3, 1992. The exact location, on land in American Fork previously used as a church welfare farm, was announced at the following conference six months later. The Mount Timpanogos Utah Temple overlooks the cities of American Fork, Cedar Hills, Highland and Alpine as well as nearby Utah Lake. Mount Timpanogos, the peak from which the temple gets its name, and the Wasatch Mountains serve as a backdrop.

Ground was broken for the Mount Timpanogos Utah Temple a year after its announcement. Approximately 12,000 people gathered on the temple site for the ceremony. During the services, the location of the Madrid Spain Temple was announced.

Twenty-thousand people attended a ceremony as the angel Moroni statue was lifted to its resting place on the  spire of the temple in July 1995. Once the statue was in place, the throngs of visitors broke into applause and then spontaneously began to sing The Spirit of God.

A total of 679,217 people toured the Mount Timpanogos Utah Temple during the six weeks (August 10 – September 21, 1996) of its public open house. More than 800 children's choirs - made up from nearly every ward and branch in the temple district - performed near the front entrance to the temple at least once during the open house.

Dedication
The Mount Timpanogos Utah Temple was dedicated on October 13, 1996 by Hinckley, who was then the church's president. The dedication lasted an entire week with three sessions on Sunday and four on each of the following days for a total of 27 dedicatory sessions.

Before the dedication, Hinckley and his counselors in the First Presidency, Thomas S. Monson and James E. Faust, applied mortar to the temple's cornerstone. They were followed by Boyd K. Packer, Acting President of the Quorum of the Twelve Apostles; W. Eugene Hansen of the Seventy and executive director of the church's Temple Department; Robert J. Matthews, temple president; Stephen M. Studdert, vice chairman of the temple committee; and Hinckley's wife, Marjorie.

A total of 11,617 participated in the first dedicatory session, of which about 2,900 met in the temple. The others attended the session in the American Fork Tabernacle, 12 stake centers in Utah and Wasatch counties, and the Salt Lake Tabernacle on Temple Square in Salt Lake City, locations to where proceedings of subsequent sessions were also transmitted. Like any temple dedication, admittance to the other locations was for worthy members of the church with a ticket from their bishops. Speakers for the first session were Hinckley, Monson, Faust, and Packer. They were each accompanied to the temple by their wives.

About 38,000 attended the three sessions of dedication on the first day. During the week, Hinckley presided over and spoke in 11 dedicatory sessions, including the cornerstone ceremony. Monson and Faust each presided over eight dedicatory sessions, and each spoke in 11 sessions, which included the cornerstone ceremony. A total of 52 general authorities addressed the sessions, as well as the temple presidency and matron.

Temple facts

The temple's floor plan is an adaption of the one created for the Bountiful Utah Temple. The temples are nearly identical from the outside, though the spire on each is noticeably different.

Presidents
Notable presidents of the temple include Robert J. Matthews (1996–99); Rex D. Pinegar (2002–05); L. Edward Brown (2008–11); and Noel B. Reynolds (2011–14);

See also

 The Church of Jesus Christ of Latter-day Saints in Utah
 Comparison of temples of The Church of Jesus Christ of Latter-day Saints
 List of temples of The Church of Jesus Christ of Latter-day Saints
 List of temples of The Church of Jesus Christ of Latter-day Saints by geographic region
 Temple architecture (Latter-day Saints)

References

External links
 
 Official Mount Timpanogos Utah Temple page
 Mount Timpanogos Utah Temple page

20th-century Latter Day Saint temples
Religious buildings and structures in Utah County, Utah
Religious buildings and structures completed in 1996
Temples (LDS Church) in Utah
Buildings and structures in American Fork, Utah
1996 establishments in Utah